Veronica besseya, commonly known as Alpine coral drops and Alpine kitten tails, is a species of flowering plant belonging to the genus Veronica in the family Plantaginaceae.

Description
Veronica besseya was first discovered for science by Charles Parry in 1861, in the headwaters of South Clear Creek, Colorado.

Range
Endemic to Western North America, with populations found in Colorado, New Mexico, Utah, and Wyoming.

Habitat and ecology 
Veronica besseya is quite diminutive, growing 2-8 inches in height in the alpine tundra of the Rocky Mountains. Leaves and stem range from glabrous (lacking hairs) to densely pilose (with long hairs).

Taxonomy
After its discovery, Veronica besseya was first named Synthyris alpina by Asa Gray. In 1903, it was renamed Besseya alpina by Axel Rydberg. However, it was proposed in 2004 that all Besseya species actually belong in the genus Veronica, the speedwells.

References

besseya